Heide Schröter is a former West German slalom canoeist who competed in the late 1960s. She won a bronze medal in the K-1 team event at the 1967 ICF Canoe Slalom World Championships in Lipno.

She also won at senior level the Wildwater Canoeing World Championships.

References

External links
 Heidi Schroeter at Sportlerbiographien

1941 births
Living people
German female canoeists
Place of birth missing (living people)
West German female canoeists
Medalists at the ICF Canoe Slalom World Championships